Citi may refer to:

CitiCorp related
 CitiGroup (aka Citi), American financial services company, formerly CitiCorp
 CitiBank, American bank, core of the financial group
 Citi Private Bank, a bank in the financial group
 Citibank Canada, the Canadian subsidiary of CitiGroup
 Citibank Australia, the Australian subsidiary of CitiGroup
 Citibank (Hong Kong), the Hongkong subsidiary of CitiGroup
 CitiGroup Center, NYC, NYS, USA; the iconic skyscraper headquarters of CitiCorp
 Citi Field, NYC, NYS, USA; a baseball park with naming rights held by CitiGroup
 Citi Open, annual WTA and ATP tennis tournament in the District of Columbia, USA; with naming rights held by CitiGroup

Other uses
 CITI-FM 92.1 MHz; radio station in Winnipeg, Manitoba, Canada
 Citi FM (Ghana), 97.3 MHz; radio station in Accra, Ghana
 Citi Babu (1964-2013) Tamil comedian
 Massimo Citi (born 1955), Italian science fiction writer

See also

 Volkswagen Citi Golf, a car
 Citi Bike, a bikeshare program in NYC, NYS, USA with naming rights held by CitiGroup
 
 Citi Centre (disambiguation)
 Chitti (disambiguation), aka citti
 Chithi (disambiguation), aka citti
 Citti (surname)
 City (disambiguation)